Abe  is commonly used in English-speaking countries as a diminutive of the masculine name Abraham, or as a personal name in its own right. It may refer to:

People 
 Abe Aaron (1910–1970), Canadian clarinetist and saxophonist
 Abe Addams (1926–2017), American football player
 Abe Ajay (1919–1998), American artist
 Abe Akira (1934–1989), Japanese author
 Abe Alvarez (born 1982), American baseball pitcher and coach
 Abe Anellis (1914–2001), Russian food microbiologist
 Abe Aronovitz (1898–1960), American lawyer and politician
 Abe Atkins (1893–1961), American baseball player
 Abe Attell (1884–1970), American world champion Hall-of-Fame featherweight boxer
 Abe Bailey (1864–1940), South African diamond tycoon, politician, financier and cricketer
 Abe Bekker (born 1935), British boxer
 Abe Bell, American baseball pitcher
 Abe Berenbaum, American table tennis player
 Abe Bernstein (1892–1968), American gangster
 Abe L. Biglow (1872–1923), American politician and businessman
 Abe Bluestein (1909–1997), American anarchist
 Abe Bolar (1909–2000), American double bass player
 Abe Bonnema (1926–2001), Dutch architect
 Abe Bowman (1893–1979), American baseball pitcher
 Abe Brault (1909–2007), American lawyer, naval veteran, and politician
 Abe Burrows (1910–1985), American playwright, director and humorist
 Abe Clark (1894–1973), Australian rugby player
 Abe Cohen (1933–2001), American football player
 Abe Cohn (1897–1970), American football player and basketball player, coach, and official
 Abe Coleman (1905–2007), Polish wrestler, promoter, and referee
 Abe Cunningham (born 1973), American drummer of the alternative metal band Deftones
 Abe Deutschendorf (1935–2012), American politician
 Abe Elenkrig (1878–1965), Russian-American bandleader, cornet player, barber, and recording artist
 Abe Elimimian (born 1982), American football player and coach
 Abe Eliowitz (1910–1981), American college and Canadian football player, member of the Canadian Football Hall of Fame
 Abe Elkinson (born 1969), English businessman
 A. L. Erlanger (1859–1930), American theatrical producer, director, designer and theatre owner
 Abe Espinosa (1889–1980), American golfer
 Abe Feder (1908–1997), American lighting designer
 Abe Forsythe (born 1981), Australian film and television actor, director, writer, and producer
 Abe Fortas (1910–1982), U.S. Supreme Court Associate Justice
 Abe Garver, American investment banker, magazine contributor, television commentator, and conference speaker
 Abe Gelbart (1911–1994), American mathematician
 Abe Geldenhuys (1932–1998), South African wrestler
 Abe Gibron (1925–1997), American football player and coach
 Abe Goff (1899–1984), American politician
 Abe Goldberg (1929-2016), Polish-born Jewish Australian businessman
 Abe Goldstein (1898–1977), American world champion bantamweight boxer
 Abe Gray (born 1982), American-New Zealand politician and cannabis activist
 Abe Greenhalgh (1920–1982), British weightlifter
 Abe Greenthal (1822–1889), American criminal
 Abe Gubegna (1933–1980), Ethiopian writer
 Abe Gutnajer (1888–1942), Polish art dealer
 Abe Harrison (1867–1932), American baseball player
 Abe Hartley (1872–1909), Scottish footballer
 Abe Hawkins (died 1867), American horse jockey and freed slave
 Abe Holzmann (1874–1939), American composer
 Abe M. Hudson Jr. (born 1976), American politician
 Abe Isoo (1865–1949), Japanese socialist, parliamentarian, and pacifist
 Abe Jacob (born 1944), American sound designer and audio engineer
 Abe Jacobs (born 1928), New Zealand professional wrestler
 Abe Johnson, American baseball player
 Abe Jones (1880–1890), American baseball player
 Abe Jones, American attorney
 Abe Jones Jr. (1899–1923), English footballer
 Abe Kakepetum (1944–2019), Canadian Anishinaabe painter
 Abe Katzman (1868–1940), Klezmer violinist, bandleader, composer, and recording artist
 Abe Kesh (1933–1989), American DJ and record producer
 Abe King (born 1957), Filipino basketball player
 Abe Knoop (born 1963), Dutch football goalkeeper
 Abe Kovnats (1928–1996), Canadian politician
 Abe Kruger (1885–1962), American baseball pitcher
 Abe Laboriel Jr. (born 1971), American drummer
 Abe Laguna (born 1992), American DJ
 Abe Landa (1902–1989), Australian politician
 Abe Lastfogel (1898–1984), Russian politician
 Abe Lemons (1922–2002), American college basketball player and coach
 Abe Lenstra (1920–1985), Dutch footballer
 Abe Levitow (1922–1975), American cartoon animator and director
 Abraham Lincoln (1809–1865), 16th president of the United States
 Abe Lincoln (1907–2000), American jazz trombonist
 Abe Loewen, Canadian drag racer
 Abe Lyman (1897–1957), American jazz bandleader
 Abe Manley (1885–1952), American baseball executive
 Abe Martin (1906–1997), American football player, football, basketball, and baseball coach, and college athletics administrator
 Abe Martin (1908–1979), American college football player, head coach and administrator
 Glenn Martin (coach) (1906–1997), American college football, basketball and baseball coach
 Abe Masahiro (1819–1857), Japanese chief senior councillor
 Abe Masakatsu (1541–1600), Japanese samurai
 Abe Masakiyo (1850–1878), Japanese daimyō
 Abe Masakoto (1860–1925), Japanese daimyō
 Abe Masanori (1806–1823), Japanese daimyō
 Abe Masatsugu (1569–1647), Japanese daimyō
 Abe Masatō (1828–1887), Japanese daimyō
 Abe Masayoshi (1769–1808), Japanese daimyō
 Abe McDougall (1876–1948), Australian rules footballer
 Abe Meyer (1901–1969), American film score composer
 Abe Mickal (1912/1913–2001), Lebanese-American college football player and doctor
 Abe William Miller (1897–1964), Canadian lawyer and politician
 Abe Mitchell (1887–1947), English golfer
 Abe Mitchell, American baseball player
 Abe Moffat (1896–1975), Scottish trade unionist and communist activist
 Abe Mosseri (born 1974), American professional backgammon and poker player
 Abe Most (1920–2002), American clarinetist and alto saxophonist
 Abe Motozane (1513–1587), Japanese samurai
 Abe Munro (1896–1974), New Zealand rugby player
 Abe Newborn (1920–1997), American talent agent and theatre producer
 Abe Notshweleka (1954–2021), South African Army soldier
 Abe Okpik (1928–1997), Canadian Inuit community leader
 Abe Olman (1887–1984), American songwriter and music publisher
 Abe Orpen (1854–1937), Canadian businessman
 Glenn Osser (1914–2014), American musician, musical arranger, orchestra leader and songwriter
 Abe Peck (born 1945), American magazine consultant, writer, editor, and professor
 Abe Peled, Israeli-American businessman
 Abe Piasek (1928–2020), American U.S. Army soldier and slave labor camp survivor
 Abe E. Pierce III (1934–2021), American educator and politician
 Abe Poffenroth (1917–1997), American football and baseball coach
 Abe Pollin (1923–2009), American businessman and owner of several major sports teams
 Abe Reles (1906–1941), American-Jewish mobster
 Abe Rich (1926–2008), Lithuanian wood craftsman and Holocaust survivor
 Abe Rosenthal (1921–1986), English footballer
 Abe Ruef (1864–1936), American lawyer and politician
 Abe Saffron (1919–2006), Australian hotelier, nightclub owner, and property developer
 Abe Saperstein (1908–1966), UK-born American founder and owner of the Harlem Globetrotters
 Abe Sarkis (1913–1991), American mobster
 Abe Schwartz (1881–1963), Romanian-American Klezmer violinist, composer, Yiddish theater and ethnic recordings bandleader
 Abe Segal (1930–2016), South African tennis player
 Abe Shannon (1869–1945), Australian pastoralist
 Abe Shires (1917–1993), American football player
 Abe Silverstein (1908–2001), American engineer
 Abe Simon (1913–1969), American heavyweight boxer
 Abe Sklar (1925–2020), American mathematician and professor
 Abe Stark (1894–1972), American businessman and politician
 Abe Stern (1888–1951), American film producer
 Abe Tadaaki (1602–1671), Japanese politician
 Abe Terry (born 1934), English rugby league footballer of the 1950s and 1960s
 Abe Thompson (born 1982), American soccer player
 Abe Turner (1924–1962), American chess master
 Abe W. Turner (1893–1947), American politician
 Abe Vigoda (1921–2016), American actor
 Abe Waddington (1893–1959), English cricketer
 Abe Walsh (born 1971), American author
 Abe Watson (1871–1932), Australian rules footballer
 Abe White (1904–1978), American baseball player
 Abe Wiersma (born 1994), Dutch rower
 Abe Wilson (1899–1981), American football player
 Abe Wolstenholme (1861–1916), American baseball player
 Abe Woodson (1934–2014), American football player
 Abe Yourist (1909–1991), Russian-American basketball player
 Abe Zvonkin (1910–2002), Canadian track and field athlete, Canadian football player, and wrestler

Fictional characters 
 Abe (Oddworld), primary protagonist in the Oddworld fictional universe
 Abe Carver, on the soap opera Days of Our Lives
 Abe Martin, titular main character of the American comic strip of the same name
 Abe Pollack, fictional time travel theorist in tv series Quantum Leap
 Abe Sapien, in the Hellboy comic book series
 Abraham Simpson, on The Simpsons
 Abe Slaney Sherlock Holmes The Adventure of the Dancing Men

See also 
 Old Abe (died 1881), a bald eagle, the mascot of the 8th Wisconsin Volunteer Regiment in the American Civil War

References 

English masculine given names
English-language masculine given names
Masculine given names
Hypocorisms